The following is a list of events effecting Philippine television in 1989. Events listed include television show debuts, finales, cancellations, and channel launches, closures and rebrandings, as well as information about controversies and carriage disputes.

Events
 September: ABS-CBN makes history with satellite broadcasts to Filipinos living in the Northern Mariana Islands and Guam, the first overseas broadcasts for a Philippine television network via satellite relay.
 October 8: Radio Philippines Network is relaunched as the New Vision 9 network with its tagline "The Future", while RPN remains its corporate name, its news service is rebranded as News9.
 December 1–9: Coverage of the 1989 Philippine coup attempt airs on all stations, with ABS-CBN making one of the first nationwide via satellite news coverages ever made.

Premieres

Unknown
Dobol Trobol on RPN 9
Blotter on RPN 9
Isip Pinoy on RPN 9
Correctionals on RPN 9
Hilda Drama Specials on RPN 9
Basta Barkada on RPN 9
Bubog sa Puso on ABS-CBN 2
Sta. Zita at si Mary Rose on ABS-CBN 2
Del Monte Kitchenomics on ABS-CBN 2
Seiko TV Presents on ABS-CBN 2
Budoy on ABS-CBN 2
Ellas A.D. on ABS-CBN 2
Cafe Bravo on ABS-CBN 2
Cooking Atbp on ABS-CBN 2
Cooking It Up with Nora on ABS-CBN 2
Aiko Drama Special on IBC 13
El Corazon de Oro on IBC 13
Regal Shocker on IBC 13
13, 14, 15 on IBC 13
Kalatog Pa Rin on IBC 13
Pelikula sa Trese on IBC 13
Saint Peregrine: TV Sunday Mass on IBC 13
Viva Spotlight on GMA 7
A Little Night of Music on GMA 7
Family 3 + 1 on GMA 7
Pabuenas sa Siete on GMA 7
Issues and Answers on GMA 7
Bulilit on GMA 7
Word of Hope on GMA 7

Programs transferring networks

Finales
 February 11: Coney Reyes on Camera on RPN 9
 February 16:
 Okay Ka, Fairy Ko! on IBC 13
 Viva Blockbusters on ABS-CBN 2
 February 17:
 Afternoon Delight on ABS-CBN 2
 Eat Bulaga! on RPN 9
 Agila on RPN 9
 August 20: GMA Saturday/Sunday Report on GMA 7
 October 8: RPN NewsBreak on New Vision 9
 November 24:
 Balita sa IBC on IBC 13
 Balita sa IBC: Huling Ulat on IBC 13

Unknown dates

Unknown
Apple Pie, Patis, Pate, Atbp. on RPN 9
Banyuhayon on RPN 9
Kaluskos-Musmos on RPN 9
Superstar on RPN 9
Seiko TV Presents on RPN 9
Lutong Bahay on RPN 9
Golpe de Gulo on GMA 7
Bubog sa Puso on ABS-CBN 2
Regal Drama Presents on ABS-CBN 2
Pinoy Fantasy on ABS-CBN 2
Budoy on ABS-CBN 2
Let's Go Crazy with Jack & Joey on ABS-CBN 2
Dina on ABS-CBN 2
Morning Treats on ABS-CBN 2
Not So Late Night With Edu on ABS-CBN 2
Manila, Manila on ABS-CBN 2
Pinoy Thriller on IBC 13
Kalatog Pa Rin on IBC 13
Pinoy Wrestling on IBC 13
Cine Pinoy on IBC 13
Pelikula sa Trese on IBC 13
Regal Shocker on GMA 7
U.F.O.: Urbano, Felissa & Others on GMA 7
Date a Star on GMA 7
Someone's on Your Side on GMA 7

Births
 January 9 - Fely Irvine
 January 12 - Arci Muñoz, Filipina actress and commercial model
 January 20 - Isabella Isa Fabregas, marketing assistant and singer
 January 22 -
 Rich Asuncion, actress
 RJ Padilla, actor
 January 25 - Yasmien Kurdi, actress, singer and mother
 January 29 - Dawn Chang, member of Girltrends
 February 5 - Cristine Reyes, Filipina actress
 February 11 - Lovi Poe, actress
 February 13 - Kenneth Ken Punzalan, actor and dancer
 March 3 - Sef Cadayona, actor
 March 7 - Gerald Anderson (Born Gerald Randolph Opsima Anderson Jr.), Filipino American actor (The Former Loveteam of Kim Chiu in 4 years "2006-2010" and Sarah Geronimo in 1 year "2011-2012" and Former Relationship of Maja Salvador in 2 years In their Break-up "2013-2015").
 March 17 - Kirby de Jesus
 April 2 - Danita Paner, Filipina singer and actress
 April 3 – Gian Carlos, actor and TV Host 
 April 10 - Dex Quindoza, actor
 April 21 – Marice Ice Martinez, broadcaster
 April 26 – Nikko Ramos, Filipino DJ of Magic 89.9 and presenter basketball of UAAP on ABS-CBN Sports and Action of ABS-CBN Sports. 
 May 2 –
 Monica Verallo, Filipina journalist and TV host 
 Tina Marasigan, TV personality
 May 17 - Kris Bernal, actress
 May 27 - Yam Concepcion, Filipina actress
 May 31 - Ailyn Luna, former actress
 July 12 - Xian Lim (Born Alexander Xian Cruz Lim Uy), Chinese-Filipino actor, singer and host (The former Loveteam of Kim Chiu as "KimXi")
 July 20 - Rayver Cruz, Filipino actor and Dancer
 August 9 - Miko Raval (born Kevin Michael Raval), actor, basketball player and model
 August 18 - Nikki Bacolod, singer and actress
 August 21 - Marvin Barrameda, actor and Host
 August 22 - Chariz Solomon, actress
 September 21 - Jef Gaitan, actress
 September 27 - Robi Domingo, actor
 October 2 - Janine Gutierrez, actress
 November 5 – Enchong Dee (Born Ernest Lorenzo Velasquez-Dee) (Younger Brother of AJ Dee), actor and former De La Salle Green Archers swimmer
 November 6 - Shaina Magdayao, actress
 November 12 - Gino M. Santos, director and producer
 November 15 - Jona Viray, singer
 November 20 - Edgar Allan Guzman, actor
 November 21 - Ejay Falcon, (Born Ejay Lasap Falcon) (Big Win Placer of Pinoy Big Brother in 2008), actor and TV Host
 November 22 - Valerie Weigmann, actress, TV Host and Beauty Queen
 November 26 - Angeline Quinto, actress and singer
 December 11 - Sam Pinto, actress
 December 15 - Coraleen Waddell, actress and commercial model.
 December 26 - Jennica Garcia, actress

References

See also
1989 in television

 
Television in the Philippines by year
Philippine television-related lists